Q Centauri (Q Cen) is a binary star in the constellation Centaurus.  It has a combined apparent magnitude of +4.99 and is approximately 270 light years from Earth.

The primary component, Q Centauri A, is a blue-white B-type main sequence dwarf with an apparent magnitude of +5.7.  Its companion, Q Centauri B, is a white A-type main sequence dwarf with an apparent magnitude of +7.1.  The two stars are separated by 5.5 arcseconds on the sky.

References 

Centauri, Q
Binary stars
B-type main-sequence stars
A-type main-sequence stars
Centaurus (constellation)
5141
118991
066821
Durchmusterung objects